Chrysoblephus gibbiceps (red stumpnose) is a cold water, reef-dwelling endangered species of sea bream, closely related to the red Roman. It is endemic to the South African south and east coasts, ranging from False Bay near Cape Town to Margate on the Natal Southcoast. It is known as 'Miss Lucy' along the Port Elizabeth coast.

First described and named by the French zoologist Achille Valenciennes in 1830, 'Chrysoblephus' means 'golden-eyed', while 'gibbiceps' refers to the bulbous forehead developed by adult males. Adults are territorial and solitary, and are found on offshore reefs at depths between 30 and 150 metres, the juveniles remaining in shallow water until mature at about 30 cm in length. Adults can grow to 75 cm long and a mass of about 9 kg, and have powerful molars used to crush food items such as redbait, sea urchin, octopus and crab.

The species spawns during the summer months on offshore reefs along the Eastern Cape coast. It is slow-growing and has been over-exploited because of its tastiness. Catch restrictions have been implemented since 2004 in an effort to re-establish this once abundant species.

References

Sparidae
Endemic fauna of South Africa